Zhengzhou Xinzheng International Airport  is the principal airport serving Zhengzhou, the capital of Henan province, China.

It was opened on 28 August 1997, replacing its predecessor, the now-demolished Dongjiao Airport. The airport is the only international airport in Henan and serves as a main gateway for the province and the central plain area.

The airport is operated by Henan Airport Group and is a hub for Cargolux, as well as a focus city for China Southern Airlines, Shenzhen Airlines, West Air, Lucky Air, and Donghai Airlines. According to statistics of 2018, it is the 12th-busiest airport by passenger traffic in the People's Republic of China with 27,334,730 passengers, and the seventh busiest airport in terms of cargo traffic nationwide. As of 2018, the airport is the busiest airport in central China in both passenger and cargo traffic.

Its IATA code "CGO" is derived from Zhengzhou's former romanization Chengchow.

History

Early development
The former international airport of Zhengzhou, known as Zhengzhou Dongjiao Airport, was built in 1956. However, the airport, which had a 2,400 meter long and 45 meter wide runway, capable of handling airliners as large as a Boeing 767,  was too close to the city center, worsening the air and noise pollution, especially from jet-powered planes like the Trident and Boeing 737 . Development of many buildings in the area worsened the dire situation, thus risking aircraft-related accidents. Hence, to meet the demand of city development, a plan to build a new airport in Xuedian Township, Xinzheng to replace the old Dongjiao Airport was approved in 1992. The new airport was originally named Zhengzhou Xuedian Airport after the township of its location and was later changed to the current name. Construction began in 1993 and the new airport was opened on 28 August 1997 with a terminal of 45,900 square meters and a runway (Runway 12R/30L) of 3,400 m. The designed capacity of the terminal was 3.8 million passengers a year. All the flights of Dongjiao Airport were transferred to the new airport. Dongjiao Airport was later demolished to build the Zhengdong New Area CBD on its site.

In 2000, the airport was approved by the state council to become the 21st international airport in China.

From 2005 to 2007, the original terminal underwent a major expansion and renovation. The new terminal (current Terminal 1) has an area of 128,000 square meters and was opened on 29 December 2007.

Phase II expansion
In 2013, the state council approved the expansion project of the airport, including a new terminal (Terminal 2), the second runway (Runway 12L/30R) and a ground traffic center (GTC), in alignment with its first airport-based economy zone (Zhengzhou Airport Economy Zone). The construction started in 2012, and was finished in 2015. Terminal 2 was opened on 19 December 2015 together with the GTC, and the second runway was opened on 7 January 2016, making the airport the first with two terminals and two runways in central China.

Recent development
After Foxconn Zhengzhou (the main production base for iPhone, located just to the north of the airport) was put into operation in 2010, the cargo transport of the airport has been booming. Between 2010 and 2017, the cargo volume handled by the airport increased from 85,798.1 to 502,714.8 metric tonnes, growing by 34 percent yearly on average, making it the seventh busiest airport in China by cargo traffic.

Long-haul and intercontinental passenger services from the airport also began to emerge in recent years. In late 2015 Emirates announced it would begin service from Dubai to Zhengzhou via Yinchuan from May 2016, as part of the airline's expansion plans in China. This is Zhengzhou's first connection to the Middle East. The service started from 3 May 2016 and stopped from November 2018. On 11 November 2016, Sichuan Airlines launched non-stop flights to Vancouver. It is the first regular non-stop intercontinental passenger service for the airport. Non-stop flight service to Melbourne was opened by Jetstar on 6 December 2017.  This is the first air route to Australia from the airport.

The airport rail link services between Zhengzhou city center and the airport became available after the completion of the ground traffic center in 2015, including the Zhengzhou–Xinzheng Airport intercity railway, which started operations from 31 December 2015 and served as an express link, and Zhengzhou Metro Chengjiao line, which started operations from 12 January 2017.

In 2017, the airport surpassed Wuhan Tianhe International Airport and Changsha Huanghua International Airport in terms of passenger traffic, making it the busiest airport in central China in both passenger and cargo traffic.

Infrastructure

Terminal 1 (closed)
The current Terminal 1 was opened on 29 December 2007, after the expansion and renovation of the former terminal, which was opened in 1998. The roof of Terminal 1 is shaped like waves.

After the opening of Terminal 2, it was closed as a future reserve and temporarily transformed into an exhibition hall.

Terminal 2
Terminal 2, the only terminal building in operation at present, is located to the northeast of Terminal 1. Terminal 2 has an X-shaped layout with four piers seeing from above, which resembles and implies "opened arms to embrace the world". The northwest pier is for international flights and others are for domestic use.

Ground traffic center

The ground traffic center (GTC) was opened together with Terminal 2. It is to the west of Terminal 2 and is connected to the arrival hall of Terminal 2 by three corridors. The GTC has been designed to become a transportation hub for traffic between the airport and cities in central plains region, with an intercity train station and a metro station on the underground floors. Passengers can take taxis, intercity coaches, intercity trains and Zhengzhou Metro trains here.

Air-traffic control tower

The new air-traffic control tower was put into use on 7 January 2016, together with the second runway.

Runways 

The airport has two parallel runways:

The north runway has a Category II Precision Approach. Normally, the north runway (12L/30R) is used for landing while the south runway (12R/30L) is used for taking-off.

Airlines and destinations

Passenger

Cargo

Ground transportation

Highway

 S1 Zhengzhou Airport Expressway
 G4 Beijing–Hong Kong and Macau Expressway

Both expressways are connected to the airport via Yingbin Elevated Road.

Rail
Airport rail link is served by Zhengzhou–Xinzheng Airport intercity railway and Zhengzhou Metro Chengjiao line.

Intercity railway

The Xinzheng Airport railway station is located in the GTC. The waiting hall and ticket offices are on the B2 floor and platforms are on the B3 floor. Intercity trains to Zhengzhou, Zhengzhou East, Jiaozuo and Songchenglu (Kaifeng) are in operation.

Metro

Trains of the Chengjiao Line of the Zhengzhou Metro connects the airport to downtown Zhengzhou using through services via Line 2.

Bus

Shuttle bus
There are several airport shuttle bus routes to various destinations in Zhengzhou. The bus station is on the first floor of Terminal 2.

Inter-city coach
The airport also offers inter-city coach services to and from other cities in the central plain region, including Luoyang, Kaifeng, Xuchang, Xinxiang, Nanyang, Anyang, Jiaozuo, Pingdingshan, Shangqiu, Zhoukou, Zhumadian, Heze, Changzhi, and Jincheng. Unlike the Zhengzhou routes, inter-city coaches depart from the GTC.

City bus
There are several bus routes, operated by Zhengzhou Bus Communication Corporation, serving the airport and neighbouring areas in the Zhengzhou Airport Economy Zone.
 611: towards Shizu Road bus terminal
 612: towards Yongzhou Road and Yuanling Road
 613: towards Hang'an 2 Street and Jichang 6 Road
 638: towards South gate of Zhengzhou Garden-Expo Park
 Y636: night service, towards Lingkong Street and Taihu Road

Accidents and incidents
 On 4 February 2014, Joy Air Flight 1533, a Xian MA60 carrying 7 crew members and 37 passengers from Taiyuan Wusu International Airport to Zhengzhou Xinzheng International Airport had a mechanical failure on the landing gear while landing at Zhengzhou. The nose gear collapsed and the aircraft's nose cone hit the runway. No passengers or crew suffered any injuries.
 On 5 February 2014, heavy snowfall forced the airport to close for several hours in the afternoon and evening, leaving roughly 2,000 passengers stranded in the airport on one of the busiest travel days of the annual New Year. Many grew frustrated by the lack of information provided by airport or airline staff, and began damaging check-in desks and flight information displays, with some assaulting staff as well. The riot and further snow forced the airport to close again on the next day. Police eventually came to the scene and restored order (See Zhengzhou Airport riot).
 On 15 April 2018, Air China Flight 1350, an Airbus A321 from Changsha Huanghua International Airport to Beijing Capital International Airport was diverted to make an emergency landing at Zhengzhou Xinzheng International Airport. It was reported that a flight attendant was held hostage by a male passenger with a pen. No one suffered any injuries in this incident.

See also

List of airports in China
List of the busiest airports in China

References

External links

 Official website

Airports in Henan
Transport in Zhengzhou
Airports established in 1997
1997 establishments in China